Thlopthlocco Tribal Town is both a federally recognized Native American tribe and a traditional township of Muscogee Creek Indians, based in Oklahoma. The tribe's native language is Mvskoke, also called Creek.

Pronunciation
An item in the Tulsa World explained: "The sound of the "thl" is usually spelled with an "r" in the Muscogee language and is pronounced in English by placing the tongue halfway between the "th" position and the "l" position."

History

The Muscogee Creek confederacy was composed of autonomous tribal towns, governed by their own elected leadership. The Creek originated in the Southeastern United States, in what is now Alabama and Georgia. They were collectively removed from the southeast to Indian Territory under the United States' Indian Removal Policy of the 1830s.

Before 1832, the Thlopthlocco Tribal Town split from a larger town. It was removed to Indian Territory in 1835. The members of the town settled in an area south of Okemah, Oklahoma, in what would become Okfuskee County, on lands that were originally occupied by the Osage and Quapaw.  Those tribes ceded their lands to the US by 1825.

During the American Civil War, Thlopthlocco Tribal Town was briefly the headquarters of Confederate Col. Douglas H. Cooper. Greenleaf Town, located five miles northwest of Thlopthlocco, was the headquarters of Opothleyahola, a Muscogee leader who worked to resolve conflicts between the Creek factions during the war. He and 5000 others moved north to Kansas to avoid the Civil War. After the war, the Muscogee Creek collectively signed the 1866 Treaty with the United States and freed their slaves. The treaty also called for the Creek Freedmen to have membership in the Muscogee Nation. The freedmen settled new townships in Okfuskee County, including Boley, Bookertee, Clearview, Chilesville, and Rusk.

Thlopthlocco Tribal Town retained its tribal identity despite allotments of land to individual households under the Dawes Commission of 1896. From 1898 to 1906, members among the Five Civilized Tribes were registered on what have come to be known as the Dawes Rolls. After making allotments to households registered with the tribes, the US government declared other formerly tribal land as surplus and sold it to European-American settlers after 1906.  This further broke up tribal communal territory.

The Thlopthlocco Tribal members organized as a distinct tribe under the Oklahoma Indian Welfare Act of 1936, which followed the national Indian Reorganization Act of 1934. The original headquarters for the tribe was the Thlopthlocco Methodist Episcopal Church, located between Wetumka and Okemah.

In August 2012, National Indian Gaming Commission gave a notice to Thlopthlocco Tribal Town for their violation of Indian Gaming Regulatory Act by allowing two casinos without a management contract.

In August 2014, Thlopthlocco Tribal Town received a $500,000 grant from the U.S. Department of Agriculture as part of their partnership with Euchee Butterfly Farm to expand butterfly farming.

Government
Thlopthlocco Tribal Town is now headquartered in Okemah and Clearview, Oklahoma. Tribal enrollment is 845, with 728 members living within the state of Oklahoma, and is based on lineal descent. Ryan Morrow is the elected Mekko, or Town King. He succeeded Vernon Yarholar.

The tribal jurisdictional area of Thlopthlocco is within Creek, Hughes, Mayes, McIntosh, Muskogee, Okfuskee, Okmulgee, Rogers, Seminole, Tulsa, and Wagoner Counties. The tribe maintains a close relationship with the Muscogee (Creek) Nation and falls under the jurisdiction of their tribal courts.

Economic development
Thlopthlocco operates its own tribal housing program, smoke shop, and the Golden Pony Casino, located in Okemah. The tribe's economic impact for 2011 was $12,500,000.

Two Atlanta, Georgia-based companies, named Titan Network LLC and Mercury Gaming Group LLC, operate casinos in the town, including Golden Pony Casino.

Notes

External links
 Tlopthlocco Tribal Town, official website
 Constitution and By-Laws of the Thlopthlocco Tribal Town, Thorpe College, University of Oklahoma

Native American tribes in Oklahoma
Muscogee tribal towns
Federally recognized tribes in the United States